The Torres–Banks languages form a linkage of Southern Oceanic languages spoken in the Torres Islands and Banks Islands of northern Vanuatu.

Languages
François (2011) recognizes 17 languages spoken by 9,400 people in 50 villages, including 16 living (3 of which are moribund) and one extinct language.

The 17 languages, ranked from northwest to southeast, are:

{| class="wikitable sortable"
! Language !! Number of speakers !! ISO 639-3 code !! Island(s) spoken
|-
| Hiw || 280 ||  [hiw] || Hiw
|-
| Lo-Toga || 580 ||  [lht] || Tegua, Lo, Toga
|-
| Lehali || 200 ||  [tql] || Ureparapara
|-
| Löyöp || 240 ||  [urr] || Ureparapara
|-
| Volow || extinct ||  [mlv] || Mota Lava
|-
| Mwotlap || 2100 ||  [mlv] || Mota Lava
|-
| Lemerig || 2 (moribund) ||  [lrz] || Vanua Lava
|-
| Vera'a || 500 ||  [vra] || Vanua Lava
|-
| Vurës || 2000 ||  [msn] || Vanua Lava
|-
| Mwesen || 10 (moribund) ||  [msn] || Vanua Lava
|-
| Mota || 750 ||  [mtt] || Mota
|-
| Nume || 700 ||  [tgs] || Gaua
|-
| Dorig || 300 ||  [wwo] || Gaua
|-
| Koro || 250 ||  [krf] || Gaua
|-
| Olrat || 3 (moribund) ||  [olr] || Gaua
|-
| Lakon || 800 ||  [lkn] || Gaua
|-
| Mwerlap || 1100 ||  [mrm] || Merelava
|}

Comparative studies
A. François has published several studies comparing various features of the Torres–Banks languages:
 François (2005): Inventories of vowel systems, and their historical development;
 François (2007): Systems of noun articles, and their historical development;
 François (2009): How several languages grammaticalized a set of light personal pronouns into markers for “aorist” aspect;
 François (2011): How Torres–Banks languages tend to show structural isomorphism, yet lexical diversity;
 François (2013): Etymological reconstruction of spiritual terms in Torres–Banks languages;
 François (2015): Systems of geocentric space directionals, and their historical development;
 François (2016): Historical morphology of personal pronouns.

François (2012) is a sociolinguistic study of the area.

Genealogical structure of the Torres–Banks linkage
The internal structure of the Torres–Banks linkage was assessed based on the Comparative method, and presented in the framework of historical glottometry (François 2014, 2017; Kalyan & François 2018).

Kalyan & François (2018: 81) identified the following best-supported subgroups (in decreasing order of genealogical closeness):
 Mwotlap – Volow
 Hiw – Lo-Toga
 Vurës – Mwesen
 Lemerig – Vera'a
 Koro – Olrat – Lakon
 Dorig – Koro – Olrat – Lakon
 Olrat – Lakon
 Lehali – Löyöp – Mwotlap – Volow
 15 Banks languages together (Lehali – Löyöp – Mwotlap – Volow – Lemerig – Vera'a – Vurës – Mwesen – Mota – Nume – Dorig – Koro – Olrat – Lakon – Mwerlap)
 etc.

Proto-language

Notes

References
Codrington, Robert Henry (1885). The Melanesian Languages. Oxford: Clarendon Press (full text from the Internet Archive).

 .

External links
 Map and information on the 17 Torres & Banks languages.

Languages of Vanuatu